The 1982 European Wrestling Championships  was held from 17 to 25 April 1982 in Varna, Bulgaria.

Medal table

Medal summary

Men's freestyle

Men's Greco-Roman

References

External links
Fila's official championship website

Europe
W
European Wrestling Championships
Euro
1982 in European sport